Connor Deutsch (born October 6, 1993), better known by the ring name Clark Connors is an American professional wrestler. He is currently signed to New Japan Pro-Wrestling (NJPW), where he was the winner of the 2020 Lion's Break Crown.

Professional wrestling career

Early career (2017–2018)
Connors made his debut on April 15, 2017, working mainly for Canadian independent promotions such as All-Star Wrestling and West Coast Wrestling Connection. He also appeared for DEFY Wrestling, in his home state of Washington in the United States.

New Japan Pro-Wrestling (2018–present)

Young Lion (2018–2019) 
In 2018, Connors entered the New Japan Pro-Wrestling LA Dojo, as the first class along with Karl Fredericks and Alex Coughlin, training under Katsuyori Shibata. Connors made his in-ring debut beating Coughlin in a dark match at Fighting Spirit Unleashed. Connors visited Japan for the first time as a representative of the LA Dojo at the Young Lion Cup held in September 2019 and came third in the tournament along with Coughlin with 8 points. Over the next few months, Connors would lose to many New Japan wrestlers and draw to his fellow young lions, which is common for young lions during their training. Through New Japan's partenership's with other promotions, Connors was also able to make appearances for Ring of Honor and Revolution Pro Wrestling.

In July and August 2019, Connors and Fredericks teamed up with Shibata's close friend KENTA in tag team matches during the G1 Climax 29 tournament, in which KENTA was competing. This led to a feud with young lions Ren Narita and Yota Tsuji, who were young lions training in the Japanese New Japan Dojo. On the final day, Connors and Fredericks defeated Narita and Tsuji in a tag team match. Connors returned to the US to compete in the Super-J Cup, but was defeated in the first round by T. J. Perkins. After the tournament, Connors began to team frequently with TJP, including in that years Super Junior Tag League, where the team finished with 2 points, with a record of 1 win and 6 losses, only beating the team of Tiger Mask and Yuya Uemura, therefore failing to advance to the tournament finals.

NJPW Strong and Wild Rhino (2020–2022)
In March 2020, New Japan suspended all of its activities, due to the COVID-19 pandemic, causing American-based talent, such as Connors to not be able to travel to Japan. Therefore, Connors appeared primarily on New Japan's new American based show NJPW Strong. In September, Connors participated in the Lion's Break Crown. He defeated Jordan Clearwater in the first round and Logan Riegal in the semi-finals. In the tournament finals, he defeated Danny Limelight to win the tournament, his first tournament win in his New Japan career. Connors again participated in the Super-J Cup but was once again defeated in the first round, this time by Chris Bey. During this time, Connors began referring to himself as a 'Wild Rhino' and it was confirmed by Shibata he was no longer a young lion.

The following year in March, Connors defeated TJP to qualify for a place in the New Japan Cup USA tournament, however he was defeated by Lio Rush in the first round. Connors then entered New Japan's Tag Team Turbulence Tournament, once again teaming with TJP, but they lost to eventual winners The Good Brothers, in the first round. In October, during NJPW Strong's Autumn Attack, TJP turned on the LA Dojo and joined United Empire, this led to the LA Dojo beginning a feud, where they would mainly lose to the group on Strong. This ended when in January 2022, at New Beginning in USA, where Connors defeated TJP. Connors challenged for the Strong Openweight Championship at Strong Style Evolved but was defeated by champion Tom Lawlor. In March, the LA Dojo, which was still represented by graduates like Connors, Coughlin and Fredericks, began a feud with All Elite Wrestling's The Factory as they fought over which was the superior wrestling developmental system. This led to a match at Windy City Riot, in which Connors, Fredericks and Yuya Uemura, lost to The Factory's Aaron Solo, Nick Comoroto and Q. T. Marshall. Soon after, Connors and other LA Dojo members made their debuts on the May 10 edition of AEW Dark, saving the LA Dojo’s The DKC and Kevin Knight from a post-match attack by The Factory. The following week, LA Dojo members defeated The Factory in a ten-man tag team match.

On May 1, Connors was announced for the 2022 edition of the Best of the Super Juniors, making his return to Japan since his graduation. He competed in the A-Block, finishing with a record of 4 wins and 5 losses, resulting in 8 points, therefore failing to advance to the finals. On the day of the finals, Connors teamed with Titán, Yoh and Robbie Eagles in a losing effort to Wheeler Yuta, El Lindaman, Ace Austin and Alex Zayne.

Connors was announced to be in the NJPW qualifying bracket for a chance to advance to AEWxNJPW: Forbidden Door to be a part of a four-way match to crown the inaugural AEW All-Atlantic Champion. In the first qualifier Connors defeated Tomoaki Honma, but lost in the final qualifier to Tomohiro Ishii, who advanced to the PPV. However, it was later revealed that Ishii had suffered a left knee injury, therefore Connors took his place at the PPV, facing Pac, Malakai Black and Miro for the All-Atlantic championship in a losing effort.

Connors was scheduled to compete at Music City Mayhem in late July, challenging for the MLW National Openweight Championship against champion Davey Richards, however, it was revealed Connors was injured and suffering from a herniated disc in his back, therefore he was replaced by Rocky Romero. Connors returned 3 months later at Rumble on 44th Street. After being escorted to the ring by Ken Shamrock, Connors lost to Minoru Suzuki. Connors returned to Japan, teaming with Ryusuke Taguchi in the Super Junior Tag League. The duo finished with a record of 6 points, failing to advance to the finals.

Championship Pursuits (2023–Present)
On February 18 at Battle in the Valley, Connors faced Zack Sabre Jr for the NJPW World Television Championship, but was defeated. On the March 9 edition of Ring of Honor, Connors returned to Ring of Honor for the first time in 4 years, challenging Wheeler Yuta to a match for his ROH Pure Championship, after Yuta had called out the LA Dojo members, which Yuta accepted.

Championships and accomplishments
New Japan Pro-Wrestling
Lion’s Break Crown (2020)
Pro Wrestling Illustrated
Ranked No. 261 of the top 500 singles wrestlers in the PWI 500 in 2022

References

External links 

 

1993 births
Living people
People from Snoqualmie, Washington
American male professional wrestlers